Chokhur-e Sa'd may refer to:
 Erivan Province (Safavid Empire), a province of the Safavid dynasty of Iran centered on the modern country of Armenia
 Erivan Khanate, a province of the Afsharid, Zand and Qajar dynasties of Iran centered on the modern country of Armenia